In anatomy, the extrapyramidal system is a part of the motor system network causing involuntary actions. The system is called extrapyramidal to distinguish it from the tracts of the motor cortex that reach their targets by traveling through the pyramids of the medulla. The pyramidal tracts (corticospinal tract and corticobulbar tracts) may directly innervate motor neurons of the spinal cord or brainstem (anterior (ventral) horn cells or certain cranial nerve nuclei), whereas the extrapyramidal system centers on the modulation and regulation (indirect control) of anterior (ventral) horn cells.

Extrapyramidal tracts are chiefly found in the reticular formation of the pons and medulla, and target lower motor neurons in the spinal cord that are involved in reflexes, locomotion, complex movements, and postural control. These tracts are in turn modulated by various parts of the central nervous system, including the nigrostriatal pathway, the basal ganglia, the cerebellum, the vestibular nuclei, and different sensory areas of the cerebral cortex. All of these regulatory components can be considered part of the extrapyramidal system, in that they modulate motor activity without directly innervating motor neurons.

The extrapyramidal tracts include parts of the following:
rubrospinal tract
pontine reticulospinal tract
medullary reticulospinal tract
lateral vestibulospinal tract
tectospinal tract

See also
 List of regions in the human brain
 Extrapyramidal symptoms
 Rabbit syndrome, a rare extrapyramidal side effect
 Reticulospinal tract
 Tectospinal tract
 Vestibulospinal tract

References 

Central nervous system
All articles with unsourced statements
Motor system